This is a list of number-one country songs in Canada by year from the RPM Country Tracks chart (1964–2000) and Billboard Canada Country chart (2006–present).

RPM (1964–2000)

Billboard (2006–present)

See also
 List of number-one country hits (United States)
 List of number-one country albums (Canada)
 List of years in country music

External links
Billboard Canada Country chart

 
Country